Vladimir Ovchinnikov may refer to:

 Vladimir Ovchinnikov (painter) (1911–1978), Soviet-Russian painter, representative of the Leningrad school of painting
 Vladimir Ovchinnikov (pianist) (born 1958), Russian pianist
 Vladimir Ovchinnikov (athlete) (born 1970), Russian javelin thrower
 Vladimir Ovchinnikov (graffiti artist) (born 1938)